The Critics' Choice Movie Award for Best Sound is a retired award given to people working in the motion picture industry by the Broadcast Film Critics Association from 2009 to 2011.

List of winners and nominees

2000s
2009: Avatar
 District 9
 The Hurt Locker
 Nine
 Star Trek

2010s
2010: Inception
 127 Hours
 Black Swan
 The Social Network
 Toy Story 3

2011: Harry Potter and the Deathly Hallows – Part 2
 Hugo
 Super 8
 The Tree of Life
 War Horse

S
Film sound awards
Lists of films by award